St. Joan of Arc Secondary School (SJA) is a Roman Catholic co-educational school founded in 1955 by a group of Catholic women who graduated from the University of Hong Kong. 

English is the primary medium of instruction in St. Joan of Arc Secondary School. It is the medium of instruction in junior Form English, Mathematics and Integrated Science. English is the language of instruction for most of the NSS subjects.

In Chinese Language classes, Mandarin language is the medium of instruction. Chinese language is used in some of the elective subjects.

St. Joan of Arc Secondary School is currently located in Braemer Hill, North Point, Hong Kong Island, Hong Kong.

Class structure
There are four classes from Form I to VI.

All classes are named after a Christian virtue: Faith, Hope, Charity, Justice, Wisdom and Courage.

Facilities
There are 31 air-conditioned classrooms and 15 special rooms fully equipped with IT facilities. There are also a chapel, a playground, a school hall, a student-activity centre, a lecture hall, a multimedia learning centre, a library fully equipped with IT facilities, a newly designed music room and a visual art room in our school. In terms of sport facilities, there is a football pitch, basketball court and a multifunctional indoor sport ground.

School Organisation
Past Students' Association
Parent-Teacher Association
Campus TV

Student Councils
Students' Union
Students' Representative Council
SJA Fund Committee (Students' Working Team)
Prefect Council
Monitor Council
Librarian Council
IT Prefect Council
Club Chairman Council

Extra-curricular activities

References

External links

Official website of St. Joan of Arc Secondary School

Catholic secondary schools in Hong Kong
Secondary schools in Hong Kong
North Point
Braemar Hill